Behrain is a tehsil located in Swat District, Khyber Pakhtunkhwa, Pakistan. The population is 61,787, according to the 2017 census.

See also 
 List of tehsils of Khyber Pakhtunkhwa

References 

Tehsils of Khyber Pakhtunkhwa
Populated places in Swat District